Ethylidene diacetate is an organic compound with the formula (CH3CO2)2CHCH3. A colorless low-melting solid, it once served as a precursor to vinyl acetate.

Preparation
A major industrial route involves the reaction of acetaldehyde and acetic anhydride in the presence of a ferric chloride catalyst:
CH3CHO  +  (CH3CO)2O →  (CH3CO2)2CHCH3

It can be converted to the valuable monomer vinyl acetate by thermal elimination of acetic acid:
(CH3CO2)2CHCH3   →   CH3CO2CH=CH2  +  CH3CO2H

References

Acetate esters